Josh Iosefa-Scott (born 16 July 1996) is a New Zealand rugby union player who plays for the  in Super Rugby. His playing position is prop. He has signed for the Highlanders squad in 2019.

Reference list

External links
itsrugby.co.uk profile

1996 births
New Zealand rugby union players
New Zealand expatriate sportspeople in England
Living people
Rugby union props